Damchik is a rural locality (a settlement) in Obrastsovo-Travinsky Selsoviet, Kamyzyaksky District, Astrakhan Oblast, Russia. The population was 40 as of 2010.

Geography 
Damchik is located 50 km south of Kamyzyak (the district's administrative centre) by road. Poldnevnoye is the nearest rural locality.

References 

Rural localities in Kamyzyaksky District